Nervia monostichus, the single-stitch ranger or AWOL ranger, is a species of butterfly in the family Hesperiidae. It is found in north-eastern Zimbabwe and Namibia. The habitat consists of grassy highveld.

Adults are on wing from February to April.

References

Butterflies described in 1982
Butterflies of Africa
Hesperiinae